The Third Stanhope Ministry was the tenth ministry of the Government of the Australian Capital Territory, and was led by Labor Chief Minister Jon Stanhope and his deputy Katy Gallagher. It was sworn in on 11 November 2008, following the Stanhope government's re-election for a third term in the 2008 election. It ended on 16 May 2011 with the appointment of the First Gallagher Ministry following the resignation of Jon Stanhope and subsequent election of Katy Gallagher as Chief Minister.

The new ministry saw no change in personnel from the previous ministry, but major changes to the portfolios of respective ministers. These included Jon Stanhope's assumption of responsibilities for territory and municipal services, including a new distinct transport ministry; Katy Gallagher taking the difficult corrections portfolio from Simon Corbell; Corbell taking the environment ministry from Stanhope and the police ministry from John Hargreaves, and Hargreaves taking the industrial relations portfolio from Andrew Barr.

First arrangement
This covers the period from 11 November 2008 (when the Ministry was sworn in) until 9 November 2009.

Second arrangement
The year-old government initiated a significant reshuffle of the ministry on 9 November 2009, coinciding with the resignation of John Hargreaves and the appointment of a replacement minister in Joy Burch. There was one minor change after this point, when, one month later, on 1 December 2009, an additional ministry for land and property services was added to Stanhope's responsibilities, and an additional ministry for children and young people was restored (held by Andrew Barr in the first arrangement) to Joy Burch.

References

Australian Capital Territory ministries
Australian Labor Party ministries in the Australian Capital Territory